William Henry Froehlich (June 22, 1857January 31, 1942) was an American businessman and a Republican politician. He served as the 16th Secretary of State of Wisconsin, and served two terms in the Wisconsin State Assembly, representing Washington County.

Biography
Born in Jackson, Washington County, Wisconsin, Froehlich graduated from Spencer Business College in Milwaukee, Wisconsin. He was a bookkeeper and clerk in Milwaukee and then went into business for himself in Jackson, in general merchandise and grain.  He served as postmaster of Jackson from 1881 to 1893 and served on the school board from 1891 to 1899. He also served as town clerk and justice of the peace. In 1895 and 1897, Froehlich served in the Wisconsin State Assembly. He served as that state's sixteenth Secretary of State, serving two terms from January 2, 1899 to January 5, 1903. He was a Republican and served under governors Edward Scofield and Robert La Follette, Sr.

Embezzlement
In 1923, Froehlich, who was the former cashier at the Jackson State Bank, pleaded guilty to embezzlement and was sentenced to prison. In 1925, Governor John Blaine gave a conditional pardon to Froehlich saying Froehlich did not have the criminal attitude to take advantage of people.

Death
Froehlich worked for the Milwaukee County Park Board until he retired. He died in Milwaukee, Wisconsin on January 31, 1942.

References 

1857 births
1942 deaths
People from Jackson, Washington County, Wisconsin
Businesspeople from Wisconsin
School board members in Wisconsin
Republican Party members of the Wisconsin State Assembly
Secretaries of State of Wisconsin
Wisconsin politicians convicted of crimes
Wisconsin postmasters